is a train station in Hyōgo-ku, Kobe, Hyōgo Prefecture, Japan.

Layout
The station has 2 island platforms serving 3 tracks.

Surroundings
Misaki Park
Misaki Park Stadium (Noevir Stadium Kobe)
Misaki Depot
Nitori
Yamada Denki
Kobe Century Memorial Hospital
Kawasaki Heavy Industries Rolling Stock Company

Bus
Kobe City Bus bus stops (Yoshidacho Nichome, Kimpeicho)
Route 3: to Yoshidacho Itchome
Route 3: for Higashi-Shiriike Itchome, and Naguracho
Route 3: for Wadamisaki, Shinkaichi, Yumenocho, and Naguracho

Gallery 

Stations of Kobe Municipal Subway
Railway stations in Japan opened in 2001
Railway stations in Hyōgo Prefecture